Paul Thomas Silva (1897–1974) was a notable New Zealand soldier, timber worker, axeman and bridge builder. He was born in Great Barrier Island, Auckland, New Zealand in 1897. His father was Domingo Silva, a Brazilian of African descent, who arrived in New Zealand in about 1867. John da Silva, an Olympic wrestler, was his nephew.

References

1897 births
1974 deaths
People from Great Barrier Island
New Zealand military personnel
New Zealand people of Brazilian descent
New Zealand woodchoppers